"Pass the Mic" is the first single from the third studio album Check Your Head by American rap group the Beastie Boys, released on April 7, 1992.

Sampling lawsuit

In 2003, Beastie Boys were involved in the landmark sampling decision, Newton v. Diamond. In that case, a federal judge ruled that the band was not liable for sampling James Newton's "Choir" in their track, "Pass the Mic". The sample used is the six-second flute stab. In short, Beastie Boys cleared the sample but obtained only the rights to use the sound recording and not the composition rights to the song "Choir". In the decision, the judge found that:

Track listing
 "Pass the Mic" (LP version) – 4:30
 "Dub the Mic" (Instrumental) – 4:26
 "Drunken Praying Mantis Style" – 2:37
 "Pass the Mic (Pt. 2, Skills to Pay the Bills)" – 4:24
 "Netty's Girl" – 5:39

Samples
 "Choir" by James Newton, from Axum
 "Big Take Over" by Bad Brains, from Bad Brains
 "So What'cha Sayin'" by EPMD, from Unfinished Business
 "Big Sur Suite" by Johnny "Hammond" Smith, from Higher Ground
 "Tax Free" by Jimi Hendrix Experience, from Los Angeles Forum - April 26, 1969 (sample at 1:48)

Charts

References

1992 singles
1992 songs
Beastie Boys songs
Capitol Records singles
Songs written by Ad-Rock
Songs written by Mike D
Songs written by Adam Yauch
Songs written by Mario Caldato Jr.
Song recordings produced by Mario Caldato Jr.